The 2019 season was the Minnesota Vikings' 59th in the National Football League (NFL), their fourth playing home games at U.S. Bank Stadium and their sixth under head coach Mike Zimmer. They improved on their 8–7–1 campaign from 2018 with a Week 14 win over the Detroit Lions, and returned to the playoffs following a one-year absence after the Los Angeles Rams lost to the San Francisco 49ers in Week 16. That week, the Vikings were eliminated from contention for the NFC North division title, losing 23–10 to the Green Bay Packers. They defeated the New Orleans Saints 26–20 in overtime in the Wild Card round but lost 27–10 to the San Francisco 49ers in the Divisional Round.

Draft

Notes
The Vikings were awarded three compensatory selections at the NFL's annual spring owners' meetings. They received one additional pick in the sixth round and two in the seventh round, compensating for the losses of Teddy Bridgewater, Tramaine Brock and Shamar Stephen.

Draft trades

Staff

Roster

Preseason

Schedule
The Vikings' preliminary preseason schedule was announced on April 9, with exact dates and times finalized on April 17.

Game summaries

Week 1: at New Orleans Saints

Week 2: vs. Seattle Seahawks

Week 3: vs. Arizona Cardinals

Week 4: at Buffalo Bills

Regular season

Schedule

Note: Intra-division opponents are in bold text.

Game summaries

Week 1: vs. Atlanta Falcons

Week 2: at Green Bay Packers

Week 3: vs. Oakland Raiders
The Vikings defeated the Oakland Raiders for their 500th win as a franchise, with an overall record of 500-427-11 at that point.

Week 4: at Chicago Bears

Week 5: at New York Giants

Week 6: vs. Philadelphia Eagles

Week 7: at Detroit Lions

Week 8: vs. Washington Redskins

Week 9: at Kansas City Chiefs

Week 10: at Dallas Cowboys

Week 11: vs. Denver Broncos

Week 13: at Seattle Seahawks

Week 14: vs. Detroit Lions

Week 15: at Los Angeles Chargers

Week 16: vs. Green Bay Packers

Week 17: vs. Chicago Bears

Standings

Division

Conference

Postseason

Schedule

Game summaries

NFC Wild Card Playoffs: at (3) New Orleans Saints

NFC Divisional Playoffs: at (1) San Francisco 49ers

Statistics

Team leaders

Source: Minnesota Vikings' official website

League rankings

Source: NFL.com

Pro Bowl
Three Vikings players were selected for the 2020 Pro Bowl when the initial rosters were announced on December 18, 2019: running back Dalvin Cook, safety Harrison Smith and defensive end Danielle Hunter. It was Smith's fifth Pro Bowl and Hunter's second, while Cook made his Pro Bowl debut. With the withdrawal of several NFC players, including San Francisco 49ers fullback Kyle Juszczyk, defensive end Nick Bosa and cornerback Richard Sherman, Green Bay Packers quarterback Aaron Rodgers, and Chicago Bears linebacker Khalil Mack, several Vikings were added to the roster for the Pro Bowl: fullback C. J. Ham, defensive end Everson Griffen, cornerback Xavier Rhodes, quarterback Kirk Cousins and linebacker Eric Kendricks. It was a first Pro Bowl appearance for Ham and Kendricks, a second for Cousins, a third for Rhodes and a fourth for Griffen.

References

External links

Minnesota
Minnesota Vikings seasons
Minnesota Vikings